Katarzyna "Kasia" Moś (born 3 March 1987) is a Polish singer, songwriter, and dancer. She was previously a member of The Pussycat Dolls Burlesque Revue in 2011, and in 2012, she came third in the third series of the Polish version of Must Be the Music. She represented Poland in the Eurovision Song Contest 2017 with the song "Flashlight", and finished in 22nd place.

Life and career

Early life and education 
Kasia is the daughter of Marek Moś, a part of the musical group Aukso. She is a graduate of the Frederic Chopin Music School in Bytom, where she studied cello and piano. She has a degree in jazz and contemporary music, graduating from Karol Szymanowski Vocal Academy of Music in Katowice. At age fifteen, Moś began to attend vocal classes by Elżbieta Chlebek, her first steps towards a professional singing career.

Music career 
At the beginning of her musical career, Moś worked with ensembles such as, among others, Stetsons and Big Band Lotharsi, as well as with the group The Fire, which consisted of teachers and students of the jazz department at the Katowice Academy of Music.

In 2002, she recorded her first demo, which was written by, among others, Robert Janson, the founder of Varius Manx. In 2005, she released "I Wanna Know", which she performed in Piosenka dla Europy 2006, Poland's national final for the Eurovision Song Contest 2006. She finished in tenth place. From 2008 to 2009, she played the character of Judas in the play Pasja wg św. Marka by Paweł Mykietyn. The play was shown at, among others, the Wratislavia Cantans, the Polish Music Festival in Kraków and Warsaw Autumn.

In 2011, Moś traveled to Las Vegas, United States, where she met American producer Robin Antin, founder of the girl band The Pussycat Dolls. After returning to Poland, she recorded several demo songs and sent them to Antin. Later in the year, she traveled to the United States again, after being asked by Antin to join The Pussycat Dolls Burlesque Revue with which she performed at, among other places, the Viper Room. During the half-a-year contract, she collaborated with singers such as Kelly Osbourne, Mýa and Carmen Electra, and was invited by actress Eva Longoria to sign at a charity auction organised by her foundation.

In 2012, she auditioned for the third series of the Polish version of Must Be the Music. During her audition, she performed "(You Make Me Feel Like) A Natural Woman" by Aretha Franklin and advanced to the next round, eventually qualifying to the semi-finals. In the first semi-final she took part in, she sang "Czerwony jak cegła" by Dżem and qualified to the final, where she came third. During her time on the show, she collaborated with Tax Free on the song "Uwierz", which was included on the band's debut album, Na ostatnim piętrze nieba. The song was recorded to support the fight against dog abuse. In September, Moś played the role of Cordelia in the world premiere of the musical Król lear by Paweł Mykietyn.

In 2014, she became a spokesperson for Link4, an insurance company. In October 2015, she released her debut studio album Inspination. One of the singles from the album, "Addiction", qualified to Krajowe Eliminacje 2016, Poland's national final for the Eurovision Song Contest 2016. In the final, which took place on 5 March 2016, the song received 3.39% of the vote, and placed sixth. In the same year, Moś appeared on the cover of the October issue of Polish version of Playboy magazine.

In February 2017, she released "Flashlight", which will be included on her second studio album. The song qualified to Poland's national final for the Eurovision Song Contest 2017 and won. On 9 May, Moś performed in the first semi-final of the contest, placing 9th with 119 points and ultimately qualified to the final. The final took place on 13 May and the singer went on to place 22nd with 64 points.

She collaborated with Norma John to release "Wild Eyes".

Discography

Studio albums

Singles

As featured artist

Promotional singles

Krajowe Eliminacje

Entries in Eurovision Song Contest Pre-Selections

References

External links

1987 births
Living people
People from Ruda Śląska
Polish women singers
Polish pop singers
Eurovision Song Contest entrants for Poland
Eurovision Song Contest entrants of 2017
The Pussycat Dolls members